Fabiola Campomanes Rojas (born 30 July 1972) is a Mexican actress.

Biography
Campomanes enrolled at the Centro de Educación Artística (CEA) run by Televisa. In addition, she studied film and television direction at UCLA. Campomanes began her career in Los parientes pobres (1993) acting next to Lucero and Ernesto Laguardia. After that, she began acting in the telenovelas Imperio de Cristal (1995), María José (1995) and in Los hijos de nadie (1997).

In 1998, Campomanes earned her first starring role in the telenovela Azul tequila. She continued in La calle de las novias (2000), and Ladrón de corazones (2003), as co-protagonist.

In 2005, Campomanes received the proposal to pose naked for Playboy magazine, which she accepted. She then posed for the magazine H Extremo. The following year she returned in the telenovela Duelo de Pasiones interpreting the villain Thelma, and in 2008 playing another villain, Alice, in Las tontas no van al cielo, acting alongside Jacqueline Bracamontes, and Jaime Camil. In 2009, Campomanes received the proposal to star in the telenovela Niños Ricos, Pobres Padres for the network Telemundo. In 2010, she returned to Televisa, in the telenovela Teresa, portraying the innocent Esperanza, and shared credits with Angelique Boyer and Sebastián Rulli.

After production on Teresa ended, Campomanes interpreted the twins of the telenovela Amorcito corazón. In 2014 she played Jennifer, her second co-starring role, in Mi corazón es tuyo, sharing credits with Silvia Navarro, with whom she had previously performed in La calle de las novias. also made his last novel in Televisa

In 2016, she switched to the TV Azteca broadcaster, which saw her grow up as an actress.

Filmography

Awards and nominations

Premios TVyNovelas

MTV Movie Awards Mexico

References

External links
 
Fabiola Campomanes
Gallery at her manager's website.
Mexico Playboy Magazine Issue No. 36 | October 1, 2005

1972 births
Living people
Mexican telenovela actresses
Mexican television actresses
Mexican film actresses
Mexican television presenters
Actresses from Mexico City
20th-century Mexican actresses
21st-century Mexican actresses
People from Mexico City
Mexican women television presenters